Goryak-dong is a ward of Gwangyang, Jeollabuk-do, South Korea.

Administrative neighborhood Goryak-dong holds five legal-status neighborhoods Hwanggeum-dong, Hwanggil-dong, Doi-dong, Seonghwang-dong, and Junggun-dong.

References

Gwangyang
Neighbourhoods in South Korea